Dongbu Chanyeyuan Area (lit. Eastern Industrial Park Area) is a designated area for city planning of Dongguan, Guangdong province, China.

References 

 

County-level divisions of Guangdong
Geography of Dongguan